Café Cubano (also known as  Cuban espresso, Colada, Cuban coffee, cafecito, Cuban pull, and Cuban shot) is a type of espresso that originated in Cuba. Specifically, it refers to an espresso shot which is sweetened (traditionally with natural brown sugar which has been whipped with the first and strongest drops of espresso). However, the name is sometimes used to refer to coffee based drinks that include Cuban espresso as the main ingredient, such as café con leche.

Drinking café cubano remains a prominent social and cultural activity in Cuba and in Cuban-American communities, particularly in Miami, Tampa and the Florida Keys.

Preparation
Traditional Cuban-style coffee is made using the darker roasts, typically either Italian or Spanish roasts, with the brands Cafe Bustelo, Cafe La Llave and Cafe Pilón being popular. It can be made using an electric espresso machine, but is commonly made with a moka pot.

A small portion of espresso from early in the brewing is added to sugar and vigorously mixed with a spoon into a creamy foam called espuma or espumita. The heat from the coffee making process will hydrolyze some of the sucrose, thereby creating a sweeter and slightly more viscous result than a normal pull or adding sugar at the table.

Variations

Cortadito is a standard espresso shot topped off with steamed milk. The ratio can be between 50/50 and 75/25 espresso and milk. It is similar to a cortado served in other Latin countries, but pre-sweetened.

Café con leche, or "coffee with milk", is an espresso served alongside a cup of hot or steamed milk. Traditionally served separate from the coffee, the espresso is poured to the desired darkness into the cup of hot milk and then stirred. It is the traditional Cuban breakfast beverage, served with slices of buttered, toasted cuban bread.

Colada is 3–6 shots of Cuban-style espresso served in a Styrofoam cup along with small, plastic demitasses. It is a takeaway form, meant to be drunk as one shot. This is customary of workplace breaks in Cuban communities.

See also

 Coffee production in Cuba
 Dalgona coffee
 List of coffee drinks
 List of hot beverages
 Vietnamese iced coffee

References

External links
 Cafe Cubano - Cuban Coffee Recipe

Cuban drinks
Coffee drinks